Tandanus tropicanus or the Wet Tropics Tandan is a species of eeltail catfish native to Australia.  It was discovered in rivers between Townsville and Cairns by a group of scientists from James Cook University.  The species, which grows to length of about 20 inches, has a cylindrical body tapering to a thin, eel-like tail.  It has small eyes and a large mouth surrounded with barbels.

References

tropicanus
Freshwater fish of Queensland
Fish described in 2014